Danielle Wotherspoon-Gregg (born April 13, 1980) is a Canadian speedskater from Red Deer, Alberta. She competes primarily in the short distances of 500m and 1000 m. Wotherspoon-Gregg qualified to compete at the 2014 Olympic Games as part of the Canadian team where she skated in the 500m event. She is the sister to Canadian speedskater Jeremy Wotherspoon and is married to teammate and 500 m speedskater Jamie Gregg, now retired, since June 1, 2013; they have three sons. Her sister is international speed skater Sarah Gregg.

References 

1980 births
Canadian female speed skaters
Living people
Olympic speed skaters of Canada
Speed skaters at the 2014 Winter Olympics
Sportspeople from Red Deer, Alberta